The Gitmo playlist refers to the songs "blasted" at inmates held by the United States at Guantanamo Bay prison in Cuba during the War on Terror. A "high-profile coalition of artists - including the members of Pearl Jam, R.E.M., and the Roots - has demanded the release of song titles used since 2002, sometimes for hours or days, to "coerce cooperation or as a method of punishment". A freedom of information request was filed by the National Security Archive, "a Washington-based independent research institute", seeking declassification of records related to music in interrogation practices. A protest of the use of music "in connection with torture" was also filed.

References

Guantanamo Bay detention camp
Music controversies
Torture